Filip Stiller (born 1 June 1982, in Gothenburg) is a Swedish figure skater who competed in men's singles. He is a four-time Nordic medalist (three silver and one bronze) and a three-time Swedish national champion.

Programs

Results

References

External links
 
 

1982 births
Swedish male single skaters
Living people
Sportspeople from Gothenburg
Competitors at the 2003 Winter Universiade
Competitors at the 2005 Winter Universiade